Serua District is a district in Serua Province in Fiji.

The biggest district in the Serua province encompassing a large land and Fisheries area. 

Extends from the chiefly Serua Island, home to the chiefly No-i-Korolevu clan, extending to Navutulevu village near the Coral Coast and up to Nabukelevu village ancestral home of the Burenitu clan, in the upper reaches of the Navua river.

Districts of Serua Province